Babu Lall (c. 1924 – 16 May 1953) was an Indian boxer. He competed in the men's bantamweight event at the 1948 Summer Olympics.

References

External links
 

1920s births
1953 deaths
Indian male boxers
Olympic boxers of India
Boxers at the 1948 Summer Olympics
Sportspeople from Kolkata
Bantamweight boxers